Kissenia capensis is a species of flowering plant in the genus Kissenia. It is endemic to Namibia.

Distribution 
Kissenia capensis is found from Namibia to the Northern Cape of South Africa.

Conservation status 
Kissenia capensis is classified as Least Concern.

References

External links 
 
 

Flora of Namibia
Flora of Southern Africa
Flora of the Cape Provinces
Plants described in 1842
Taxa named by Stephan Endlicher
Loasaceae